Fritillaria imperialis, the crown imperial, imperial fritillary or Kaiser's crown, is a species of flowering plant in the lily family Liliaceae, native to a wide stretch from the Anatolian plateau of Turkey, Iraq and Iran (i.e. Kurdistan) to Afghanistan, Pakistan, Northern India  and the Himalayan foothills. It is also widely cultivated as an ornamental and reportedly naturalized in Austria, Sicily, and Washington State, USA. The common names and also the epithet "imperialis", literally "of the emperor", refer to the large circle of golden flowers, reminiscent of an emperor's crown.

Description

It bears a prominent whorl of downward facing flowers at the top of the stem, topped by a 'crown' of small leaves, hence the name. While the wild form is usually orange-red, various colours are found in cultivation, ranging from nearly a true scarlet through oranges to yellow. The pendulous flowers make a bold statement in the late spring garden; in the northern hemisphere, flowering takes place in late spring, accompanied by a distinctly foxy odour that repels mice, moles and other small animals.

Owing to its large size, F. imperialis is pollinated by the Eurasian blue tit, which makes it a rare example of ornithophily at northern latitudes.

Cultivation
The species and the yellow-flowered 'Maximea Lutea' have both gained the Royal Horticultural Society's Award of Garden Merit. Other cultivars in shades of red, yellow and orange, are available.

Like other members of the lily family, F. imperialis is susceptible to depredation by the scarlet lily beetle (Lilioceris lilii).

Taxonomy
A few names have been coined for taxa once considered as belonging to Fritillaria imperialis but now regarded as distinct species:
 Fritillaria imperialis var. chitralensis, now called Fritillaria chitralensis
 Fritillaria imperialis var. eduardii, now called Fritillaria eduardii
 Fritillaria imperialis var. inodora, now called Fritillaria eduardii var. inodora
 Fritillaria imperialis var. inodora-purpurea, now called Fritillaria eduardii var. eduardii

Role in the culture of Iran
The flower has a long and deep connection with the history, religion, mythology and folklore of its native Iran and, as a result, has acquired a wealth of evocative vernacular names, often referencing the pendent form of the blossoms and the tear-like nectar drops borne by the six nectaries. In Iranian folklore the nodding flowers are described (in comparison with the upright flowers of tulips) as being 'upside-down', this curious posture being attributed to the plant's bowing its (originally upright) 'head' in sorrow upon the death of a mythological or religious personage. Likewise, the glistening drops of nectar at the base of each flower are described as the tears which the plant weeps in mourning the departed. Depictions  of the distinctive inflorescences may be seen on the sculpted capitals of Sassanid columns, as at Taq-e Bostan. F. imperialis is linked to the legend of the tragic death of Siyâvash, (a semi-divine hero in Ferdowsi's prodigious national epic Shahnameh) - whence the common name Ashk-e Sivash ('Tear of Siyâvash').

Gallery

References

imperialis
Plants described in 1753
Taxa named by Carl Linnaeus
Flora of Asia
Garden plants